Anombrocheir is a genus of millipedes belonging to the family Xystodesmidae.

The species of this genus are found in Western North America.

Species:

Anombrocheir bifurcata 
Anombrocheir spinosa

References

Xystodesmidae